The 1970 New Zealand bravery awards were announced via two Special Honours Lists dated 18 and 20 May 1970, and recognised three people for acts of bravery in 1969 and 1970.

George Medal (GM)
 Murray Hemopo – of Matamata.

Queen's Commendation for Brave Conduct
 Station Officer Trevor Henry Sampson – of New Plymouth.
 Fireman David Allan Weir – of New Plymouth.

References

Bravery
Bravery awards
New Zealand bravery awards